Pemberton is an unincorporated community in eastern Perry Township, Shelby County, Ohio, United States.  It has a post office with the ZIP code 45353.

History
Pemberton was platted in 1852, and named for General Pemberton, the brother of a railroad official. A post office called Pemberton has been in operation since 1854.

References

Unincorporated communities in Ohio
Unincorporated communities in Shelby County, Ohio